was a Japanese freelance newscaster and actress. She was also one of Fuji TV's weathercasters.

Early life and education
Kobayashi was born in 1982 in Ojiya, Niigata, the younger of two children. Her family moved between Saitama, Saitama and Nishinomiya, Hyogo seven times before settling in Arakawa, Tokyo when she was in high school. Her sister is Maya Kobayashi (b. 1979).

Kobayashi attended Kokugakuin Senior High School. In 2005, she graduated from the department of psychology at Sophia University.

Career 
While still in university, she gained attention for starring in Nippon TV's talk program Koi no kara Sawagi. From October 2003 to September 2006, Kobayashi served as the weather caster for Fuji TV's Mezamashi Saturday. She was appointed as the navigator for a corner on Fuji TV's Junk Sports in April 2004. In October 2006, Kobayashi became a presenter for the News Zero program on the Nippon Television Network.

In June 2004, Kobayashi made her acting debut as a flight attendant in the Fuji TV television drama Division 1: Pink Hip Girl.

During an interview for News Zero, she met kabuki actor Ichikawa Ebizō XI. On 19 November 2009, they announced that they were dating with the intent of marriage and were to be formally engaged sometime in December 2009. The couple registered their marriage on 3 March 2010 and held their wedding reception at The Prince Park Tower on 29 July 2010.

Upon marriage, Kobayashi retired from television to focus on raising a family. She gave birth to their first child, daughter Reika, on 25 July 2011. On 22 March 2013, she gave birth to their second child, son Kangen.

Personal life
Kobayashi was married to Takatoshi Horikoshi (aka Ichikawa Ebizō XI), an actor. Kobayashi had two children, a daughter Reika and a son Kangen Horikoshi.

Illness and death
Kobayashi was diagnosed with breast cancer in October 2014 but kept her illness a secret. On 9 June 2016, her husband announced her condition at a press conference after the tabloid, Sports Hochi, ran a front-page scoop about her ordeal. The cancer had reached stage four and spread to her bones and lungs. In November 2016, the BBC announced that she was one of the BBC's '100 Women 2016' — a list of inspirational and influential women for 2016 — after she started a blog about her illness and how she was dealing with it. Titled 'Kokoro', it became one of the most popular blogs in Japan.

Kobayashi died of cancer on 22 June 2017.

Filmography

Film
Tokyo Friends: The Movie (2006)
Captain (2007)
A Tale of Mari and Three Puppies (2007)

Television
 Division 1: Pink Hip Girl (Fuji TV, 2004) – Emi Saeki
 Tokyo Friends (Fuji TV, 2005) – Maki Abiko
 Slow Dance (2005) – Ayumi Hirose
 Unfair (Fuji TV, 2006) – Rieko Matsumoto
 Happy! (TBS, 2006) – Choko Ryugasaki
 Oishii Propose (TBS, 2006) – Saori Shimazaki
 Taiyou no Uta (TBS, 2006) – Yuuko Miura
 Happy! 2 (TBS, 2006) – Choko Ryugasaki

References

External links
Mao Kobayashi Blog - KOKORO- Please don't hide behind the illness.
Cent Force Profile
 
 BBC NEWS - BBC 100 Women 2016
 BBC NEWS - BBC 100 Women 2016:Kokoro the cancer blog gripping Japan

Japanese television actresses
Japanese film actresses
Japanese announcers
1982 births
2017 deaths
Sophia University alumni
21st-century Japanese actresses
Deaths from breast cancer
Deaths from cancer in Japan
BBC 100 Women
Actors from Niigata Prefecture